Bairagi Jena  was an Indian politician. He was elected to the Lok Sabha, the lower house of the Parliament of India from Bhadrak in Odisha as a member of the Janata Party.

References

External links
 Official biographical sketch in Parliament of India website

Janata Party politicians
India MPs 1977–1979
Lok Sabha members from Odisha
1929 births
2002 deaths
Utkal Congress politicians
Indian National Congress politicians